Antonio de la Maza (May 24, 1912 – June 4, 1961) was a Dominican businessman based in Santo Domingo. He was an opponent of Rafael Trujillo, and was one of the principal conspirators in the assassination of the aforementioned dictator which took place on May 30, 1961.

Life 
De la Maza was born in Moca, Espaillat. His family had ties to Horacio Vásquez who was ousted by Trujillo when he started his reign in 1930. After attending the Corps of Military Aides, De la Maza became manager of a Trujillo-owned sawmill near Restauracion. In the context of the 1956 Galindez case his brother Octavio was used as a scapegoat by Trujillo's henchmen; he was presented to the American Government as the murderer of Gerry Murphy and killed.

During the assassination De la Maza left Juan Tomás Díaz's .45 automatic pistol at the scene, a complication that facilitated the Servicio de Inteligencia Militar's work as they could identify the owner. A few days later De la Maza and Tomas Díaz were killed by the SIM when coming out of hiding.

Antonio de la Maza is a character in The Feast of the Goat, a novel by Mario Vargas Llosa.

References

1912 births
1961 deaths
People from Espaillat Province
Dominican Republic people of Canarian descent
Dominican Republic people of Cuban descent
Dominican Republic people of Spanish descent
1961 crimes in the Dominican Republic
1961 murders in North America
1960s murders in the Dominican Republic
Dominican Republic assassins
Assassins of presidents
Assassins of heads of government